Southside Community Land Trust is a 501(c)(3) non-profit organization located in Providence, Rhode Island, with a mission to provide access to land, education and other resources necessary for people in the Greater Providence area to grow food in environmentally sustainable ways as a means to creating a food system where locally produced, affordable and nutritious food is available to all.  It was established in 1981. In 2019 the trust obtained $600,0000 in funding to assist urban farmers.

References

External links
Official website
Providence Journal Article on the Southside Community Land Trust

1981 establishments in Rhode Island
Land trusts in the United States
Environmental organizations based in Rhode Island
Organizations established in 1981